Fahad Ahmed (born 11 July 2001) is a Bangladeshi cricketer. He made his Twenty20 debut for Bangladesh Krira Shikkha Protishtan in the 2018–19 Dhaka Premier Division Twenty20 Cricket League on 25 February 2019. He made his List A debut for Bangladesh Krira Shikkha Protishtan in the 2018–19 Dhaka Premier Division Cricket League on 23 March 2019.

References

External links
 

2001 births
Living people
Bangladeshi cricketers
Bangladesh Krira Shikkha Protishtan cricketers
People from Bagerhat District